Bernstein's Fish Grotto was a popular restaurant in San Francisco, California, that operated from 1907 to 1981.

Description

Opened by Maurice Bernstein (1886-1932) in 1907, Bernstein's Fish Grotto was known for its unique entrance, a ship's bow jutting into the sidewalk. It was intended to be a reproduction of Christopher Columbus' ship Niña.  Inside the restaurant, the marine theme continued. Bernstein's had seven dining rooms styled to look like ship's cabins: the Fisherman's Cave, the Pilot Room, the Sun Deck, the Main Salon, the Cabin Nooks, the Upper Deck, and the Porthole Counter. The sister restaurant in Los Angeles, was also known for its Coo-Coo Clams from Coo-Coo Cove.

Located at 123 Powell Street, near the end of the cable car line, the Grotto was a popular tourist attraction for many years.

Bernstein's Fish Grotto closed in 1981. There is now a Uniqlo retail store on the site.

References

External links
 Bernstein's Fish Grotto on Findery

1907 establishments in California
Restaurants established in 1907
1981 disestablishments in California
Restaurants disestablished in 1981
History of San Francisco
Restaurants in San Francisco
Defunct restaurants in the San Francisco Bay Area